Star Wars: Dooku: Jedi Lost is a audio drama set in Star Wars that was written by  Cavan Scott and  published on April 27, 2020, by Del Rey Books. An eBook was later released on October 1, 2019, and a paperback edition was published on March 30, 2021.

Reception
James Whitebrook of Gizmodo praised the audio drama closer examination of how Dooku's path to the dark side was more complicated than at first glance. Sean Keane of CNet also commented on Jedi: Losts exploration of Dooki's younger life, calling it "fascinating".

See also
 List of Star Wars books, the list of novels published in the Star Wars series

References

–

Novels based on Star Wars
2019 American novels
2019 science fiction novels
Del Rey books
Audio plays